Li Yugang (born July 23, 1978) is a Chinese singer and a performer in the China National Opera & Dance Drama Theater; a member of the National Youth Federation.  He specialises in "nándàn" (男旦) roles, which is male who plays female role in Peking opera.  Li has released a number of CDs.

Li Yugang directed and starred in his own stage production "Lady Zhaojun" 《昭君出塞》, a grand Oriental Poetic Stage production which took him more than three years in preparation. "Lady Zhaojun" premiered in Beijing on April 16–19, 2015, followed by a world tour. In August 2015 Li Yugang and "Lady Zhaojun" stage production were nominated at 4th Denny award in Beijing for the International Excellence in Theatrical Arts in four categories.

Early life

Li was born into a farming family in Jilin province in 1978.  His parents were too poor to send him to college even though he was accepted by the provincial Art College. He worked in various jobs in Changchun after finishing high school.

Li went to Xi'an to work as a waiter in an entertainment club after he became jobless in Changchun for a full year.  He was fascinated by the singers whom he came across for the first time in his life. Soon, he was allowed to sing a few songs and became a club singer. His breakthrough came when one day a female colleague didn't show up and he had to take her place singing in female voice. "That's how I started with female roles" recalled Li Yugang. His talent to sing both male and female voices impressed the audience. The owner of the establishment hired him full-time and he started to have a proper job. From 1998 to 2006, he began to be trained professionally and to develop his singing and acting in nan dan (male plays female role in Peking Opera).

Career

In 2006, Li came to prominence after he came third in the Star Boulevard, a nationwide talent competition programme on CCTV. His performance in "Farewell My Concubine" and "The Drunken Beauty", both from the famous Peking Opera made him an overnight sensation. He became a highly sought-after performer afterwards.

The following year, Li became an unprecedented success when he gave his first solo performance in Beijing: "Where Flowers are Unbounded". In 2009, he was invited to join the "National Performing and Dancing Company" and became China's First Class Artist (National Treasure). In that same year Li Yugang was invited to perform at Sydney Opera House in Australia, the second Chinese artist to have done so, and was awarded Southern Cross Gold Prize for Culture by the Australian Government.
 
From 2010-2014, for stage performance, Li created "Flower in Mirror, Moon in Water" ( and "The Painting of Four Beauties" ( Together he performed over 100 shows in the country and internationally. Li Yugang also released 3 CDs from his company "The New Drunken Beauty" ("The Dream Chaser" and "Lotus Flower" (. In 2014, the Rhymoi Music company released Li Yugang's "Once Upon a Time in Shanghai" ( CD album. In 2015, Li Yugang directed and starred in his own stage masterpiece "Lady Zhaojun" (a grand Oriental Poetic Stage production which took him three years in preparation.

Today, the range of Li Yugang's influence extends far beyond the entertainment world, opening up new dialogues among critics of contemporary music, theatre and aesthetics, and has become an icon in China's contemporary cultural scene.
Beyond his professional and international accolades, Li is known as a celebrity in his own hometown, Gongzhuling in Jilin, and is respected for his generous donations and help to local charity organisations, especially in education. 
A very modest man who is aware that he has not had the rigorous training of traditional Peking opera, he is constantly studying and passionately committed to make China's rich cultural heritage accessible both to the young generation and to audiences around the world.

Stage Show 

 2010 "Flower in Mirror, Moon in Water" (
 2011  "The Painting of Four Beauties" (
 2019 "Lady Zhaojun" (

Discography
2010 "The New Drunken Beauty" 《新贵妃醉酒》
2010 蘭花指 (feat. 李玉剛)
2011 "The Bell for Dream Chasing" 《逐梦令》
2014 "Once Upon a Time in Shanghai"《民国旧梦》, Rhymoi Music company
2015 "Lotus Flower" 《莲花》
2016 "Happened to Meet You"《刚好遇见你》- Single
2017 "Happened to Meet You" 《剛好遇見你》 - Album
2017 天地有靈 (《捉妖記 2》推廣曲) - Single

References

External links

CCTV-星播客-男扮女装李玉刚
李玉剛國際粉絲團 (Yugang International Fans) (Facebook Account)
Li Yugang Fan Club（李玉剛粉絲頁）(Facebook Account)

1978 births
Living people
21st-century Chinese male singers
Singers from Jilin
People from Siping